This is a list of airports in Rwanda, sorted by location.



List 

Airport names shown in bold have scheduled commercial airline service.

See also 
 Transport in Rwanda
 Rwandan Air Force
 List of airports by ICAO code: H#HR - Rwanda
 Wikipedia: WikiProject Aviation/Airline destination lists: Africa#Rwanda

References 
 
  - includes IATA codes
 Great Circle Mapper - reference for airport code and coordinates

Rwanda
 
Airports
Airports
Rwanda